Pál Pajzs (27 April 1886 – 6 September 1966) was a Hungarian fencer. He competed in the individual sabre and foil events at the 1912 Summer Olympics.

References

External links
 

1886 births
1966 deaths
Sportspeople from Székesfehérvár
Hungarian male sabre fencers
Olympic fencers of Hungary
Fencers at the 1912 Summer Olympics
Hungarian male foil fencers